Chionachne is a genus of Asian, Australian, and Papuasian plants in the grass family.

Species 
 Chionachne biaurita Hack. - Luzon
 Chionachne cyathopoda (F.Muell.) F.Muell. ex Benth. - New Guinea, northern Australia
 Chionachne gigantea (J.Koenig) Veldkamp - Indian Subcontinent, Indochina, Peninsular Malaysia, Java
 Chionachne hubbardiana Henrard - Queensland, Northern Territories, Western Australia, Java, Lesser Sunda Islands
 Chionachne javanica (Henrard) Clayton - Java, Lesser Sunda Islands
 Chionachne macrophylla (Benth.) Clayton - Maluku, New Guinea, Solomon Is, Bismarck Arch
 Chionachne massiei Balansa - Hainan, Vietnam, Laos, Thailand
 Chionachne punctata (R.Br.) Jannink - Indochina, Java, Lesser Sunda Islands, Philippines
 Chionachne semiteres (Benth.) Henrard - India, Myanmar

 formerly included
see Cleistochloa 
 Chionachne sclerachne - Cleistochloa sclerachne

See also
 List of Poaceae genera

References

Poaceae genera
Andropogoneae
Taxa named by Robert Brown (botanist, born 1773)